James Augustus Mellan (10 November 1898 – 25 September 1973) was an Australian rules footballer who played with Geelong in the Victorian Football League (VFL).

Mellan later served in the Australian Army during World War II, falsifying his age by five years in order to quality for service.

Notes

External links 

1898 births
1973 deaths
Australian rules footballers from Geelong
Geelong Football Club players
Australian Army personnel of World War II
Military personnel from Victoria (Australia)